Barbara Romanò (born 14 January 1965) is a former professional tennis player from Italy.

Biography
Romanò, who comes from Tuscany, began competing on tour in 1983 and reached a best singles ranking of 74 in the world. 

Her best performance in singles on the WTA Tour was a semi-final appearance at the 1989 Vitosha New Otani Open in Sofia and she twice reached the second round of the French Open.

As a doubles player she was runner-up in two WTA Tour tournaments, both in her home country: the 1985 Italian Open and 1990 Torneo Internazionale.

WTA Tour finals

Doubles (0-2)

ITF finals

Singles (9-1)

Doubles (9-3)

References

External links
 
 

1965 births
Living people
Italian female tennis players
Sportspeople from Tuscany
20th-century Italian women